{| align="right" class="toccolours"
|-
|colspan=2 align="center" |<big>'Palatinate-Lützelstein-GuttenbergPfalz-Lützelstein-Guttenberg</big>
|-
|colspan=2 align="center" |1611 – 1654|-
|
|-
|width=138px| CapitalCircleBench|width=138px| Guttenberg Castlenonenone
|-
|Palatinate-Guttenberg
|1611
|-
|Extinct; to Palatinate-Veldenz
|1654
|-
|}Palatinate-Lützelstein-Guttenberg''' was a state of the Holy Roman Empire based around La Petite-Pierre in the far northeast of France.

Palatinate-Lützelstein-Guttenberg was created in 1611 when George John II of Palatinate-Guttenberg inherited Palatinate-Lützelstein from his brother John Augustus. After George John died in 1654, Palatinate-Lützelstein-Guttenberg was inherited by the elder Palatinate-Veldenz line.

House of Wittelsbach
Counties of the Holy Roman Empire
1611 establishments in the Holy Roman Empire
1654 disestablishments